"Heartland" is a song written by Steve Dorff and John Bettis, and recorded by American country music artist George Strait. It was released in January 1993 as the second single from his soundtrack album Pure Country. The song reached the top of the Billboard Hot Country Singles & Tracks (now Hot Country Songs) chart.

Content
Serving as the film's intro, the song is an uptempo country-rocker, in which the narrator sings about the heartland of America – "The only place I feel at home" and "Where they still know wrong from right."

Music video
A music video was filmed for the single, which combines a live performance of the song and short clips from the movie.

Personnel
Per the liner notes of Strait's 1995 box set Strait Out of the Box. All parts were recorded on April 28, 1992, except for the electric guitar, which was recorded one day later.
 Eddie Bayers - drums
 Stuart Duncan - fiddle
 Buddy Emmons - steel guitar
 David Hungate - bass guitar
 John Barlow Jarvis - piano
 Dean Parks - electric guitar solo
 Brent Rowan - electric guitar
 Randy Scruggs - acoustic guitar
 Harry Stinson - background vocals
 George Strait - lead vocals
 Curtis Young - background vocals

Chart performance
The song debuted at number 73 on the Hot Country Singles & Tracks chart dated January 2, 1993. It spent 20 weeks on that chart, and reached Number One on the chart dated March 20, 1993.

Charts

Year-end charts

Certifications

References

1993 singles
George Strait songs
Song recordings produced by Tony Brown (record producer)
Songs written by Steve Dorff
Songs with lyrics by John Bettis
MCA Nashville Records singles
1992 songs
Songs written for films
Country rock songs
American hard rock songs